The Journal of Medical Ethics is a monthly peer-reviewed academic journal covering the field of bioethics that was established in 1975 and is published by BMJ. According to the Journal Citation Reports, the journal has a 2019 impact factor of 2.021, ranking it fourth out of 16 journals in the category "Medical Ethics" and 11th out of 55 journals in the category "Ethics".

Editors-in-chief
The editor-in-chief is John McMillan (University of Otago). Previous editors have been: Julian Savulescu (University of Oxford)  (2011–2018 and 2001–2004), Søren Holm (Cardiff University) and John Harris (University of Manchester, (jointly, 2004–2011), Raanan Gillon (Imperial College London, 1980–2001), and Alastair Campbell (University of Edinburgh, 1975–1980, founding editor).

See also
List of ethics journals

References

External links

Bioethics journals
Publications established in 1975
English-language journals
Monthly journals
BMJ Group academic journals